The Ivory Coast's only Rugby World Cup appearance was in 1995 when they were placed in Pool D with France, Scotland and Tonga.

Their appearance in the 1995 Rugby World Cup was fairly notorious and controversial. In the opening game against Scotland, the Ivory Coast lost by 89 points to nil, a result which led many to question the inclusion of "minor" teams in the tournament. Worse still, three minutes into the third match, against Tonga, their winger Max Brito was crushed beneath several other players. Despite intensive care, Brito was left paralyzed below the neck. He had caught a high ball that had been kicked up the field, and set off on a counter-attack. He was tackled by Inoke Afeaki, the Tonga flanker, before a ruck formed over him. The ruck collapsed and several players fell on top of Brito, leaving him prone and motionless on the ground. Brito was taken to the intensive care unit of the Unitas Hospital in Pretoria with broken vertebrae. Operations were carried out to stabilize the fourth and fifth vertebrae, but Brito was left paralyzed below the neck.

In a 2007 interview, Brito was portrayed as living an unhappy life. He was quoted as saying that

Brito's injury raised concerns about the presence of such teams in a rugby union environment on the brink of professionalisation.

By position

Overall record

1995 Rugby World Cup
Pool D matches -

 Côte d'Ivoire player Max Brito was left a quadriplegic after suffering a cervical spine injury in this match.

Team Records
Highest Team Score
18 vs  1995
11 vs  1995

Biggest Score Against
89 vs  1995
54 vs  1995
29 vs  1995

Worst Losing Margin
89 vs  1995
36 vs  1995
18 vs  1995

Individual Records
Most Points
8 Victor Kouassi
6 Athanase Dali
5 Soumaila Okou
5 Aboubakar Camara
5 Soulama

Most Points in a Game
8 Victor Kouassi vs 
6 Athanase Dali vs 
5 Soumaila Okou vs 
5 Aboubakar Camara vs 
5 Soulama vs 

Most Tries
1 Soulama
1 Aboubakar Camara
1 Soumaila Okou

Most Drop Goals

References
 Davies, Gerald (2004) The History of the Rugby World Cup (Sanctuary Publishing Ltd,
 Farr-Jones, Nick, (2003). Story of the Rugby World Cup, Australian Post Corporation,

Rugby World Cup by nation
Rugby union in Ivory Coast